WNVA (1350 AM) is a sports formatted broadcast radio station licensed to Norton, Virginia, serving Big Stone Gap and Wise County in Virginia.  WNVA is owned and operated by Bristol Broadcasting Company, Inc.

History
On July 20, 2007, Radio-Wise, Inc. received a $4,000 fine from the Federal Communications Commission (FCC) for not keeping all required documentation in WNVA's public file.

In the early part of 2012, WNVA dropped their Classic Country for Sports with programming from ESPN Radio.

Radio-Wise sold WNVA and sister station WNVA-FM to Bristol Broadcasting Company for $35,000, enough to settle property tax debts and outstanding FCC fines; the sale closed on January 16, 2015.

On April 5, 2016 WNVA was granted a Federal Communications Commission construction permit to move to a new transmitter site.  Instead of using a conventional steel vertical radiator used by most stations it would use an 85-foot whip antenna.  The steel vertical radiator currently in use is 360 feet.

References

External links

Wise County, Virginia
1946 establishments in Virginia
Sports radio stations in the United States
ESPN Radio stations
Radio stations established in 1946
NVA (AM)